Central Province was an electorate of the Victorian Legislative Council.

Creation
Central was one of the six original upper house Provinces of the bi-cameral Victorian Parliament created in November 1856. The area of the province, centered on Melbourne was defined in the Victoria Constitution Act 1855. 
Central Province included the Electoral Districts of Melbourne, St Kilda, Collingwood, South Melbourne, Richmond and Williamstown as well as parts of other adjoining districts.

Abolition
Central Province was abolished in the redistribution of provinces in 1882. James Lorimer and William Edward Hearn transferred from Central to Melbourne Province; Theodotus Sumner transferred to North Yarra Province; James MacBain and James Graham transferred to South Yarra Province that year.

Members
These were members of the upper house province of the Victorian Legislative Council.

1856 election results

First five elected.

References

Former electoral provinces of Victoria (Australia)
1856 establishments in Australia
1882 disestablishments in Australia